Major-General Arthur Solly-Flood  (28 January 1871 − December 1940) was a British Army officer.

Military career
Born the son of Major-General Sir Frederick Solly-Flood and Constance Eliza Frere, Arthur Solly-Flood was educated at Wellington College, Berkshire and the Royal Military College, Sandhurst. He was commissioned into the South Lancashire Regiment in 1891.

After seeing action in the Second Boer War, he became commanding officer of the 4th Royal Irish Dragoon Guards and, in that role, deployed to the Western Front during the First World War. He went on to be commander of the 35th Brigade during the Battle of the Somme in autumn 1916, Director-General of Training for the British Expeditionary Force (BEF) in January 1917 and General Officer Commanding (GOC) of the 42nd (East Lancashire) Infantry Division in October 1917. He handed over his command in June 1919 and became Military Adviser in Ireland in April 1922. He returned to the command of 42nd (East Lancashire) Infantry Division in June 1923 and then served as Major-General, Cavalry from November 1927 until he retired in February 1931.

He was appointed a Companion of the Order of the Bath in the 1919 New Year Honours.

He was colonel of the 4th/7th Dragoon Guards from 1930 to 1940.

References

External links

|-

|-

1871 births
1940 deaths
People from Southsea
Military personnel from Portsmouth
Companions of the Order of the Bath
Companions of the Order of St Michael and St George
Companions of the Distinguished Service Order
British Army major generals
Graduates of the Royal Military College, Sandhurst
British Army generals of World War I
British Army personnel of the Second Boer War
South Lancashire Regiment officers
People educated at Wellington College, Berkshire
4th Royal Irish Dragoon Guards officers